"Some Things You Never Get Used To" is a song released in 1968 by Diana Ross & the Supremes on the Motown label. The single stalled for three weeks at number 30 on the U.S. Billboard pop chart in July 1968. It became the lowest-charting Supremes single since 1963 and became the catalyst for Berry Gordy to revamp songwriting for The Supremes since the loss of Motown's premier production team Holland–Dozier–Holland, whom Gordy had assigned as the group's sole producers after the success of "When the Lovelight Starts Shining Through His Eyes."

Cash Box praised the "charming performance from Diana Ross, and here-and-there sound effect splashes."

Shelved LP
 
Motown originally created an album to capitalize on the success of the single, but when the single failed to hit the top of the charts the album was scrapped, and the single was included rather on Diana Ross and the Supremes' "Love Child" LP. The shelved LP track list was intended as follows:

Side One:

 Some Things You Never Get Used To
 Heaven Must Have Sent You
 He's My Sunny Boy
 Come On And See Me
 Can I Get A Witness
 You've Been So Wonderful To Me
 
Side two:

 My Guy
 It's Not Unusual
 Just A Little Misunderstanding
 Uptight (Everything's Alright)
 What Becomes Of The Broken Hearted
 Blowin' In The Wind

Personnel
Lead vocals by Diana Ross
Background vocals by Ashford & Simpson
Instrumentation by The Funk Brothers and the Detroit Symphony Orchestra

Track listing
7" single (21 May 1968) (North America/United Kingdom)
"Some Things You Never Get Used To" – 2:23
"You've Been So Wonderful to Me" – 2:28

Charts

Covers
The song has never had a high-profile remake. Motown singer Frances Nero recorded a version of the song several decades after she left the company, for Ian Levine and his Motorcity Records project.

It should not be confused with a 1965 song (with the same title), written by Van McCoy and recorded by Cilla Black, Irma Thomas, local Detroit singer Juanita Williams, and Detroit band The San Remo Strings.

References

1968 singles
1968 songs
The Supremes songs
Songs written by Nickolas Ashford
Songs written by Valerie Simpson
Song recordings produced by Ashford & Simpson
Motown singles
Psychedelic soul songs